The rivière aux Canards (English: Ducks River) is a tributary of the Gulf of Saint Lawrence, flowing in the municipality of L'Île-d'Anticosti, in the Minganie Regional County Municipality, in the administrative region of Côte-Nord, in province of Quebec, in Canada.

A forest road runs along the southern coast of Anticosti Island and cuts the "rivière aux Canards" near its mouth. Another forest road (north–south direction) serves the west bank of the lower part of the course of the river.

Forestry is the main economic activity in this area; recreational tourism activities, second.

Geography 
The Ducks River has its source at Lake Anna located in the western part of Anticosti Island. Lake Anna is fed on the north side by two small lakes. Its mouth is located at the end of the bay on the south shore, at:
  northeast of the town center of the village of Port-Menier;
  north of the south shore of Anticosti Island;
  south of the north shore of Anticosti Island.

From its source, the Canards River flows south between the Trois Milles River (located on the west side); and the La Petite Rivière (located on the east side).

  towards the south, then crossing Lac aux Canards at the end of the segment east, to the road running north of Port-Menier airport;
  south almost in a straight line and forming small coils, collecting three streams on the east side and three more on the west side, to a stream (coming from the north-west );
  towards the south, collecting a stream (coming from the east) and the discharge of the lakes of Pointe aux Graines, up to its mouth.

The Duck River flows into the Gulf of St. Lawrence, at the bottom of a bay (width at the entrance), on the south shore of Anticosti Island.

Toponymy 
This toponymic designation has been in use since at least 1924.

The toponym "rivière aux Canards" was made official on December 5, 1968.

See also 

 List of rivers of Quebec

References 

Rivers of Côte-Nord
Anticosti Island
Minganie Regional County Municipality